Mayo is a parliamentary constituency represented in Dáil Éireann, the lower house of the Irish parliament or Oireachtas. The constituency elects 4 deputies (Teachtaí Dála, commonly known as TDs) on the system of proportional representation by means of the single transferable vote (PR-STV).

History
At the 2002 general election Fine Gael suffered its worst electoral performance ever, losing 23 seats nationally, a figure larger than expected and with its overall vote down 5%. Enda Kenny came close to losing his seat and even went so far as to prepare a concession speech. In the end he won the third seat in the five-seat constituency.

At the 2011 general election, this was the constituency of Fine Gael leader Enda Kenny, who would become Taoiseach after the election. Fine Gael won four out of five seats in Mayo at that election. This was the first time any party won four seats in any five-seat Dáíl constituency; the last time any party had won four seats in a Dáil constituency was in the era of six- and seven-seat constituencies.

Boundaries
The constituency includes Castlebar, Westport and Ballina. Mayo is the largest Dáil constituency in Ireland by area.

The Electoral (Amendment) (Dáil Constituencies) Act 2017 defines the current constituency as:

The constituency was used for the first time at the 1997 general election and replaced the former constituencies of Mayo East and Mayo West.

TDs

Elections

2020 general election

2016 general election

2011 general election

2007 general election

2002 general election

1997 general election

See also
Dáil constituencies
Elections in the Republic of Ireland
Politics of the Republic of Ireland
List of Dáil by-elections
List of political parties in the Republic of Ireland

References

Dáil constituencies
Politics of County Mayo
1997 establishments in Ireland
Constituencies established in 1997